Allá en el Norte (English language: Somewhere in the North) is a 1973 Argentine musical comedy film directed by Julio Saraceni and written by Abel Santacruz. The film stars Lolita Torres, Carlos Estrada and Jorge Barreiro. It was created by Alberto Migré.

References

External links

1973 films
1970s musical comedy films
Films directed by Julio Saraceni
Argentine musical comedy films
1970s Spanish-language films
1970s Argentine films